James Arthur Harris (1880–1930) was a botanist and biometrician, known for the Harris–Benedict equation.

He was the head of the department of botany at the University of Minnesota from 1924 to 1930. (He was both preceded and succeeded by Carl Otto Rosendahl.)

In 1922 he was elected as a fellow of the American Statistical Association.

References

J. Arthur Harris, Botanist and Biometrician, by C. O. Rosendahl; R. A. Gortner; G. O. Burr. (See review in Ecology, 18(2) (Apr., 1937), pp. 295–298.

External links
 
whonamedit.com page

1880 births
1930 deaths
American botanists
Fellows of the American Statistical Association